Ebrahim Hussein (born 1943) is a Tanzanian playwright and poet. His first play, Kinjeketile (1969), written in Swahili, and based on the life of Kinjikitile Ngwale, a leader of the Maji Maji Rebellion, is considered "a landmark of Tanzanian theater." The play soon became one of the standard subjects for exams in Swahili language in Tanzania and Kenya. By 1981, it had been reprinted six times.

Other plays written by Hussein include Mashetani (1971), an overtly political play, Jogoo Kijijini (1976), an experiment in dramatic performance, and Arusi (1980), in which Hussein expresses disillusionment with the Tanzanian political theory Ujamaa. Short plays of his include Wakati Ukuta (1967).

Works and importance for Swahili theatre 
Hussein was educated at the Aga Khan Secondary School in Dar es Salaam and at the University of Eastern Africa's campus in the same city, where he studied French literature and Theatre Arts. There he wrote some of his first short plays, such as Wakati Ukuta (Time is a Wall) and Alikiona - Consequences. These early works often focus on tensions between the old and new generations and the tensions resulting from European colonialism. Although he accepted elements of the European notions of a "well-made play" in the tradition of Aristotle, like the picture-frame stage, he was also interested in traditional African forms of theatre and expectations of the audience. Some of his early plays, like Alikiona, incorporate elements of kichekesho, which is a comical interlude found in the middle of many taarab performances. 

During the early 1970s, Hussein studied at the Humboldt University in East Berlin and wrote his PhD dissertation "On the development of theatre in East Africa". Starting with Kinjeketile, he also employed elements of epic theatre as developed by German playwright Bertold Brecht. Later, he published Jogoo Kijini and Ngao ya Jadi, two texts for a single actor, where he used Swahili traditions of storytelling (hadithi). Therefore, his plays have been characterized as a "dramaturgy [that] appears to fuse or blend received European models of an intimate theatre with non-Aristotelian and entirely unique techniques of his own."

In his study on Hussein's importance for Swahili theatre, French scholar of African literature Alain Ricard wrote: "Ebrahim Hussein is the best known Swahili playwright, and Tanzania's most complex literary personality. Known first and foremost as a dramatist, he is also a theorist whose dissertation on the theatre in Tanzania remains the standard reference work. His plays are a corpus of theatrical material with great significance to an understanding of Tanzania's political and social development in relation to the Swahili/Islamic coastal culture, of which he is a part."

List of works

Plays 
 Kinjeketile, 1969
 Michezo ya kuigiza, 1970
 Mashetani, 1971
 Jogoo Kijijini and Ngao ya Jadi, 1976
 Arusi, 1980
 Jambo la maana, 1982
 Kwenye ukingo wa Thim, English translation At the edge of thim, 1988
 Ujamaa

Short Plays 
 Wakati Ukuta - Time is a Wall, 1967
 Alikiona - Consequences

Ngao ya Jadi - The Shield of Tradition 
Hussein's text for one actor Ngao ya Judi has been summarized as follows: Sesota, a serpent, terrorizes a village, so a young peasant is called upon to defeat Sesota. The peasant succeeds and the village rejoices. Over time, the evil the serpent brought grows again, causing the village to become more and more depraved. Eventually, Sesota returns, with no one to challenge him. 

This text is a retelling of a Swahili folk story in which Sesota is defeated by being trapped in a pot rather than killed and eventually returns. In Hussein's version, Sesota represents colonialism that the "peasant" desperately tries to fight. Hussein speaks about how the remnants of colonialism still remain and that any amount of Western influence on African culture brings back that evil. Through this, the retelling also shows that there's no "good vs. evil" like in traditional stories, but that the world is rather morally grey. One significant moment is when the village is celebrating after Sesota's death; names of a variety of famous African writers and artists are listed. Here, Hussein seems to be criticizing his fellow artists, saying that their work only comes during moments of joy, rather than being used to combat oppression.

Ebrahim Hussein's thesis 
While Hussein focused on research at the Humboldt University in East Berlin for his PhD thesis from 1970 to 1973, the first scholarly study of his work, Drama and National Culture: a Marxist Study of Ebrahim Hussein by Robert Philipson was published in 1989. Hussein wanted to develop Swahili literature that regarded the crisis of East Africa, specifically in the 1970s. At a conference on the meta-languages of literary studies, he published a study on Greek philosopher Aristotle (1980). Many of his colleagues began studies on his oeuvre after this publication, which focused on Kenyan and Tanzanian literary criticism expressed in Kiswahili.

Ebrahim Hussein Poetry Prize 
The Ebrahim Hussein Poetry prize is an honor awarded annually since 2014 to the winner of the poetry contest under the same name. The contest was created by Safarani Seushi as per wish of the late Canadian filmmaker Gerald Belkin (1940-2012). Belkin was in the process of creating this award, to be named after "his friend and renowned filmmaker and playwright, Professor Ebrahim Hussein", when he died. Belkin's goal in establishing this award and prize fund was to foster the careers of Swahili literary authors. The selected poems were published as Diwani ya tunzo ya ushairi ya Ebrahim Hussein (Anthology of Ebrahim Hussein Poetry Prize), in 2017.

Ebrahim Hussein Fellowship 
The Ebrahim Hussein Endowment for research in African expressive cultures was established in the College of Letters and Science at the University of Wisconsin-Madison in 2003, thanks to the generosity of Robert M. Philipson, alumnus of the College of Letters and Science (PhD’89). The College awards up to $7500 each year to one or more full-time graduate students in L&S to carry out research on African expressive cultures and/or archives outside of the United States. Recent winners of the fellowship include Vincent Ogoti, a Kenyan playwright.

References

Further reading

External links 
 Kinjeketile - English translation and analysis

1943 births
Swahili-language writers
Tanzanian dramatists and playwrights
Living people
Tanzanian writers